Farès Hachi (born 5 November 1989) is an Algerian professional footballer who currently plays for AS Lyon Duchère in the Championnat National.

Before joining MC Alger in 2017, Hachi had spent the whole of his senior career in France, representing Échirolles, Cassis Carnoux, Chamois Niortais and Grenoble and in Algeria with ES Sétif and in South Africa with Mamelodi Sundowns.

Club career

ES Sétif

Mamelodi Sundowns
The Algerian left-hander has signed for two and a half years with Mamelodi Sundowns, defending champion of South Africa and last winner of the African C1 to become the first Algerian player to play in South Africa.

Career statistics

Club

Honours
ES Sétif
 Algerian Super Cup: 2015

Mamelodi Sundowns
 CAF Super Cup: 2017

References

External links
 Farès Hachi at foot-national.com
 
 

1989 births
Living people
Footballers from Algiers
Algerian footballers
Association football fullbacks
FC Échirolles players
SO Cassis Carnoux players
Chamois Niortais F.C. players
Grenoble Foot 38 players
ES Sétif players
Mamelodi Sundowns F.C. players
Chippa United F.C. players
MC Alger players
Lyon La Duchère players
Championnat National players
Championnat National 2 players
South African Premier Division players
Algerian Ligue Professionnelle 1 players
People from El Biar
Expatriate soccer players in South Africa
21st-century Algerian people